Denis John Boocker (4 January 1922 – 8 June 1987), also known by the nickname of "Dinny", was a Welsh professional rugby league footballer who played in the 1940s and 1950s.

Background
Denis Boocker was born in Ystrad, Wales (birth registered in Pontypridd district), and he died aged 65 in Kurri Kurri, Australia.

Boocker played in Kurri Kurri's 1945 premiership win. In 2010 he was named at centre in Kurri Rugby League Club's team of the century.

Playing career

International honours
Denis John Boocker was selected for Wales whilst at Wakefield Trinity during the 1948/49 and 1949/50 seasons.

County Cup Final appearances
Denis John Boocker played left-, i.e. number 4, in Wakefield Trinity's 7–7 draw with Leeds in the 1947 Yorkshire County Cup Final during the 1947–48 season at Fartown Ground, Huddersfield on Saturday 1 November 1947, played left-, i.e. number 4, in Wakefield Trinity's 8–7 victory over Leeds in the 1947 Yorkshire County Cup Final replay during the 1947–48 season at Odsal Stadium, Bradford on Wednesday 5 November 1947, and played , i.e. number 5, in the 17–3 victory over Keighley in the 1951 Yorkshire County Cup Final during the 1951–52 season at Fartown Ground, Huddersfield on Saturday 27 October 1951.

Club career
Denis John Boocker made his début for Wakefield Trinity, and scored a try in the 15–8 victory over Salford at Belle Vue, Wakefield on Saturday 25 October 1947, he is second on Wakefield Trinity's all-time tries scored in a season list, scoring 32-tries in 1953–54 Northern Rugby Football League season, a record later extended to 38-tries by Fred Smith and David Smith, he appears to have scored no drop-goals (or field-goals as they are currently known in Australasia), but prior to the 1974–75 season all goals, whether; conversions, penalties, or drop-goals, scored 2-points, consequently prior to this date drop-goals were often not explicitly documented, therefore '0' drop-goals may indicate drop-goals not recorded, rather than no drop-goals scored. In addition, prior to the 1949–50 season, the archaic field-goal was also still a valid means of scoring points.

Contemporaneous Article Extract
A typical action picture of Denis Boocker taken during Trinity's game with Belle Vue Rangers in August 1935, when the Welsh-Australian scored four tries. It shows the famous "swallow-dive" which Boocker used so effectively on many of his try-scoring occasions.
Born in Gelli, Wales, Booker emigrated to Australia two years later. Commenced his football career with Karri-Karri (sic) at seventeen. After four years in the Forces he joined the Newtown Club from where Trinity signed him in 1947.
He made his début for Trinity on 25 October 1947, against Salford at Belle Vue. After a period as -threequarter he tried the  position and soon proved himself one of the best in the game. Made five appearances for Wales, including one against Australia. Extended the club try-scoring record just prior to his return "down under" in April 1954 – and he left in Wakefield many friends and exciting memories.

References
Note: "Boocker" is mis-spelt as "Booker", i.e. without the 'c', on Page-78 of the book 'Wakefield Trinity RLFC - FIFTY GREAT GAMES'.

External links
Australian Cemeteries Index

1922 births
1987 deaths
Country New South Wales rugby league team players
Kurri Kurri Bulldogs players
Newtown Jets players
Rugby league centres
Rugby league wingers
Rugby league players from Rhondda Cynon Taf
People from Ystrad
Wakefield Trinity players
Wales national rugby league team players
Welsh rugby league players